Kaan 29-class fast patrol craft, known by the producer as Onuk MRTP 29,  are boats of the Coast Guard Command of Turkey, built by  Yonca-Onuk Shipyard in Istanbul. The first boat of its class – hull number TCSG-101 – was commissioned in 2001 and since then nine boats (Hull numbers TCSG-101 to TCSG-109) have been built. The last boat, TCSG-109, was delivered to the Turkish Coast Guard in April 2004.

The boat owes its high-speed to its high-engine output, deep-V hull design and reduced weight thanks to its advanced composite hull. The MTU diesels are paired with waterjet propulsion system by MJP, which make the boats very maneuverable.

The project was shelved in 2003, with the Kaan 33-class patrol boats, which were more seagoing and offered more space for the crew, storage and instruments.

These boats have also been built for the Pakistan Coast Guard.

External links

Patrol vessels of Turkey
Coast Guard Command (Turkey)